Tour de Pise is an isolated rock dome, 27 m, which protrudes through the ice in northwest Rostand Island in the Geologie Archipelago. It was charted in 1951 by the French Antarctic Expedition and named by them for the famous Tower of Pisa.

Rock formations of Adélie Land